Lucero en Concierto Sus Mas Grandes Exitos en vivo is a live album released by Lucero on 19 November 2013. A DVD also comes with the album.

Track listing

DVD

References

2013 live albums
Lucero (entertainer) albums